Olchawa is a Polish surname. Notable people with this surname include:

 Karolina Semeniuk-Olchawa (born 1983), Polish handball player
 Kunegunda Godawska-Olchawa (born 1951), Polish canoeist

See also
 

Polish-language surnames